Sfakera is a village, on the north coast of the island of Corfu, Greece. It is part of the municipal unit of Thinali. Τhe Village is predominantly inhabited by a populous with the surname Nikokavouras. Infamous members of the globally stretching Nikokavouras Family are local elder Efstathios and his son Nikos.

Populated places in Corfu (regional unit)